This is the list of the largest fast food restaurant chains by their number of locations in the world.

See also 
 List of fast food restaurant chains

Notes

References 

Fast food
Economy-related lists of superlatives
Fast food restaurant chains